The 1991–92 All-Ireland Senior Club Football Championship was the 22nd staging of the All-Ireland Senior Club Football Championship since its establishment by the Gaelic Athletic Association in 1970-71.

Lavey were the defending champions, however, they failed to qualify after being beaten in the Derry County Championship.

On 17 March 1992, Dr. Crokes won the championship following a 1-11 to 0-13 defeat of Thomas Davis in the All-Ireland final at Croke Park. It was their first ever championship title.

Results

Munster Senior Club Football Championship

First round

Semi-finals

Final

All-Ireland Senior Club Football Championship

Quarter-final

Semi-finals

Final

Championship statistics

Miscellaneous

 Corofin won the Connacht Club Championship title for the first time in their history.

References

1991 in Gaelic football
1992 in Gaelic football